The Copa del Generalísimo 1972 Final was the 70th final of the King's Cup. The final was played at Santiago Bernabéu Stadium in Madrid, on 8 July 1972, being won by Atlético Madrid, who beat Valencia 2–1.

Details

References

1972
1971–72 in Spanish football
Atlético Madrid matches
Valencia CF matches
July 1972 sports events in Europe